CIFX-FM was a Canadian radio station broadcasting on 93.7 FM in Lewisporte, Newfoundland. The station used to broadcast an adult contemporary/hot adult contemporary format branded as 93.7 Mix FM.

Approved by the CRTC in 2001, the station was launched in 2002 by local broadcaster Mix FM Inc.

As of 2016, CIFX went off the air.

References

External links
CIFX-FM history - Canadian Communications Foundation

Ifx
IFX
2016 disestablishments in Canada
2002 establishments in Canada
Radio stations established in 2002
Radio stations disestablished in 2016